Lézardrieux is a commune in the Côtes-d'Armor department of Brittany in northwestern France.

The village is situated near the mouth of the estuary of the Trieux river - the suspension bridge (Pont de Lézardrieux) across the river at this point is a French national monument.  There is a marina with moorings for several hundred pleasure boats and the tidal range experienced is remarkable.

There are a variety of shops and other commercial enterprises - including two bakeries, a butcher and, several restaurants and bars.

Population

Inhabitants of Lézardrieux are called lézardriviens in French.

Events
The village hosts a music festival in late May and several regattas depart from the port.

Personalities
Notable figures associated with the village are Paul Le Flem (composer) and Georges Brassens (musician and poet).

See also
Communes of the Côtes-d'Armor department

References

External links

Communes of Côtes-d'Armor